Mardye McDole (born May 1, 1959, in Pensacola, Florida) is a former American football wide receiver. McDole was selected in the second round by the Minnesota Vikings out of Mississippi State University in the 1981 NFL Draft.  He is currently a physical education teacher and the varsity wide receiver coach at Murphy High School in Mobile, Alabama.

He is the first receiver in Mississippi State Bulldogs history to have a  1,000-yard season.

References

External links
 

1959 births
Living people
American football wide receivers
Minnesota Vikings players
Mississippi State Bulldogs football players
High school football coaches in Alabama
Sportspeople from Pensacola, Florida
Players of American football from Pensacola, Florida